A disulfite, commonly known as metabisulfite or pyrosulfite, is a chemical compound containing the  ion .  It is a colorless dianion that is primarily marketed in the form of sodium metabisulfite or potassium metabisulfite.  When dissolved in water, these salts release the hydrogensulfite  anion. These salts act equivalently to sodium hydrogensulfite or potassium hydrogensulfite.

Structure
In contrast to disulfate, disulfite ion has an unsymmetrical structure with an S-S bond.  The oxidation state of the sulfur atom bonded to 3 oxygen atoms is +5 while oxidation number of other sulfur atom is +3.

The anion consists of an SO2 group linked to an SO3 group, with the negative charge more localized on the SO3 end.  The S–S bond length is 2.22 Å, and the "thionate" and "thionite" S–O distances are 1.46 and 1.50 Å respectively.

Production
Salts of disulfite ion are produced by dehydration of salts of hydrogensulfite ion. When solutions of sodium hydrogensulfite or potassium hydrogensulfite are evaporated, sodium metabisulfite and potassium metabisulfite result.
 2    + H2O

Although the equilibrium lies far to the left, evaporation of a bisulfite salt will produce a substantial amount of disulfite.

Disulfite is the conjugate base of disulfurous acid (pyrosulfurous acid), which originates from sulfurous acid in accordance with the dehydration reaction above:
2 H2SO3 → 2  + 2 H+  → H2S2O5 + H2O

The disulfite ion also arises from the addition of sulfur dioxide to the sulfite ion:

Use
Disulfites salts are used for preserving food and beverages.

Examples of disulphites

Sodium metabisulphite (E223) and potassium metabisulphite (E224) are used as a preservative and antioxidant in food. Sulphites are implicated is asthmatic reactions and may also cause symptoms in non-asthmatic individuals, namely dermatitis, urticaria, flushing, hypotension, abdominal pain and diarrhea, and even life-threatening anaphylaxis.

References

 
Sulfur oxyanions